The Longwave transmitter Solec Kujawski is a longwave broadcasting facility of the Polish Radio for the AM-LW (long wave) 225 kHz frequency/1333 meters wavelength. Its construction was necessary after the collapse of the Warsaw radio mast on August 8, 1991 and the resistance of the local population to its reconstruction. Tower Height 948 feet/289 meters and 1080 feet/330 meters. Height above sea level 209 feet/64 meters MSL (Mean Sea Level).

The transmitter was built in 1998/99 on a former military area near Solec Kujawski. The area was originally a hamlet called Kabat (Grosswalde) until World War II, when the Germans established a military artillery and rocket training ground in the area. The transmitter in this facility has a power of 1200 kilowatts (used 1000 kW) and is equipped with MOSFET amplifiers. The carrier frequency is, as in earlier days in the transmitter Konstantynow, generated by a set of twin high-accuracy thermally-stabilized quartz oscillators.

The taller mast is Poland's eighth highest structure.

Furthermore, there is a freestanding lattice tower close to the station building that is used for directional radio links, which serve among others for passing the program to the station.

Transmitted Programmes

See also
List of masts

External links
 
 
 https://web.archive.org/web/20050313231840/http://www.pg.gda.pl/~sp2pzh/solec.html
 http://jerzyjedrzejkiewicz.webpark.pl/str01/gabin-rcn_02.html
 http://archiwum.wiz.pl/1999/99113500.asp
 http://www.latozradiem.pl/galeria.aspx?cid=439
 http://www.skyscraperpage.com/diagrams/?b45027
 http://www.skyscraperpage.com/diagrams/?b45028
 Google Maps
 http://radiopolska.pl/wykaz/pokaz_lokalizacja.php?pid=610

Towers completed in 1999
Radio masts and towers in Poland
Bydgoszcz County
Buildings and structures in Kuyavian-Pomeranian Voivodeship
1999 establishments in Poland